JH15 (also written JH15) appears as the second element of the provisional designation of some asteroids.

A list of asteroids that include JH15 in their name:

 List of minor planets: 9001–10000, 9708 Gouka = 
 252727 =  = 
 List of minor planets: 29001–30000, 
 List of minor planets: 86001–87000, 
 List of minor planets: 99001–100000, 
 409317 =  = 
 List of minor planets: 197001–198000, 
 
 291710 = 
  = 
 List of minor planets: 217001–218000, 
 
 
 369836 =

See also
Jade Helm 15